Pallas's pika (Ochotona pallasi), also known as the Mongolian pika, is a species of small mammals in the pika family, Ochotonidae. It is found mainly in the mountains of western Mongolia.

Description

Pallas's pikas have round bodies, very short limbs, and small rounded ears. They will also have different pelage coloration depending on the time of the year. They become lighter in the summer and much darker in the winter.

Ecology

Distribution and habitat

O. p. pallasi can be geographically separated from the other three subspecies. O. p. pallasi is largely distributed in Kazakhstan and the other large group O. p. pricei, are distributed along Mongolia and bordering territories. The range for both these groups extends all the way between the Betpak Dala Desert located in Kazakhastan to the Helan Shan Range. The remaining two, which have been little-studied, O. p. argentata collected mostly at the Helan Shan Range and the O. p. sunidica found mostly near the Chinese-Mongolian border, both of which found in rocky habitats with very restricted ranges.

Diet

Pallas's pikas are much smaller in body size than other herbivores that usually share the same environment. Their body size allows them to consume more of the lower level vegetation, giving them more of an advantage over larger herbivores, such as livestock. Like other pikas, Pallas's pika is herbivorous and saves grass in the summer to eat in the winter. They often construct haypiles with this stash, but some populations prefer to keep their stores under rocks. Their diet consists mostly of grasses, however their diet does range in flowers as well as stems. Another form of further nutrition is the consumption of cecotrophs. Cecotrophs are the evacuated cecal contents that come from the pika.

Ecosystem roles

Pallas's pika mostly are found in more arid type climates. They have shown to play a role in not only seed dispersal and vegetation, but the alteration of site conditions. This alteration through burrowing, has led to plant growth and increased soil nutrients. This is a clear representation of allogenic ecosystem engineering.

Mating and reproduction

Pallas's pikas are only monogamous. Mating is between male and females. Their litter size contains an average of 5 young and around 2.7 litters per year. Reproduction will only occur in the summer. Most young by day 19 are able to consume solid food and are sexually mature as soon as 4 weeks.

Physiology

The Pallas's pika and many other subspecies show a mechanism called microbial nitrogen fixation. This is a very important mechanism consisting of an isolation of a bacterial community in the cecum and colon of the Pika called the nifH gene. Since Pallas's pika's diet consist of such poor feed, they need to have an adaptation such as this in order to provide the essential amino acids to their diet. These essential amino acids are supplied by the microorganisms produced by microbial nitrogen fixations.

Phylogeny and taxonomy

There are four defined taxa: O. p. pallasi, O. p. pricei, O. p. sunidica, and O. argentata. Mitochondrial studies show that the two larger defined taxa of O. pallasi are paraphyletic to O. argentata. However, morphometric data shows that the taxa O. p pricei and O. p. pallasii show similar traits to one other than to O. argentata. O. argentata differ in that they show a rufous type coloration in the summer and a more silver type coloration in the winter.

As a species, Pallas's pika is common. However, O. p. hamica, O. p. helanshanensis and O. p. sundica are rated as "critically endangered" and "endangered", respectively, on the IUCN Red List.

References

 Grzimek, Bernhard, ed. "Pallas's pika". Grzimek's Animal Life Encyclopedia. 2nd ed. Vol. 16. Detroit, MI: Gale, 2003. 499-500.

Pikas
Mammals of China
Mammals of Mongolia
Mammals of Russia
Mammals described in 1867
Taxa named by John Edward Gray
Taxobox binomials not recognized by IUCN